Holy Sepulchre Cemetery is a Catholic cemetery in New Rochelle in Westchester County, New York, United States. The cemetery is maintained by the Blessed Sacrament Church, whose pastor, Father McLoughlin, established it in 1886.

Holy Sepulchre Cemetery is the resting place of notables including Eddie Foy and his family of famous Vaudeville actors and actresses, memorialized in the 1955 film The Seven Little Foys.

Notable interments

 Richard Beddows (1843–1922), Civil War Congressional Medal of Honor Recipient.

 Charley Foy (1898–1984), actor
 Eddie Foy, Jr. (Edwin Fitzgerald), (1905–1983), actor
 Eddie Foy, Sr. (Edwin Fitzgerald), (1856–1928), actor

 Irving Foy, (1909–2003), actor
 Madeline Foy, (1906–1988), actress
 Mary Foy, (1901–1987), actress
 Richard Foy, (1905–1947), actor
 Harry Tierney  (1890–1965), composer

See also 
 Beechwoods Cemetery (New Rochelle, New York)

References

External links
 
 

Buildings and structures in New Rochelle, New York
Roman Catholic cemeteries in New York (state)
Cemeteries in Westchester County, New York
1886 establishments in New York (state)